Mount Hilgard is a 13,361-foot-elevation (4,072 meter) mountain summit located west of the crest of the Sierra Nevada mountain range in Fresno County of northern California, United States. It is situated in the John Muir Wilderness on land managed by Sierra National Forest, approximately eight miles east-southeast of Lake Thomas A Edison, and immediately above the west end of Lake Italy. The John Muir Trail follows Bear Creek to the west of this remote peak, providing an approach. Mt. Hilgard ranks as the 82nd highest summit in California.

History
This mountain was named by Sierra Club explorer Theodore Solomons for Eugene W. Hilgard (1833–1916), a professor at the University of California, Berkeley, and considered as the father of modern soil science in the United States. The name was suggested to Solomons in 1895 by Ernest C. Bonner, who was one of Hilgard's former students. Based on Solomon' description, the Hilgard name may have been originally intended for present-day Recess Peak. The first ascent of the summit was made July 10, 1905, by Charles F. Urquhart, USGS topographer.

Climate
According to the Köppen climate classification system, Mount Hilgard is located in an alpine climate zone. Most weather fronts originate in the Pacific Ocean, and travel east toward the Sierra Nevada mountains. As fronts approach, they are forced upward by the peaks, causing them to drop their moisture in the form of rain or snowfall onto the range (orographic lift). Precipitation runoff from this mountain drains into the San Joaquin River watershed.

See also
 List of mountain peaks of California

Gallery

References

External links

 Weather forecast: Mount Hilgard

Sierra National Forest
Mountains of Fresno County, California
Mountains of the John Muir Wilderness
North American 4000 m summits
Mountains of Northern California
Sierra Nevada (United States)